(1566 – April 5, 1637) was a Japanese samurai of the Azuchi–Momoyama period through early Edo period, who served the Tokugawa clan. He later became a daimyō, and one of the first rōjū of the Tokugawa shogunate.

Masazumi was born in 1565; he was the eldest son of Honda Masanobu. Father and son served Tokugawa Ieyasu together. Masazumi was in the main force at Sekigahara; after the battle, Masazumi was entrusted with the guardianship of the defeated Ishida Mitsunari. Masazumi was made a daimyo in 1608, with an income of 33,000 koku.

Ieyasu trusted Honda sufficiently to have relied on him as an intermediary for diplomatic initiatives with China.

Later, Masazumi served at the siege of Osaka; in 1616, he became a toshiyori; this was the position that would soon after be renamed as rōjū. In this role, he worked closely with the now-retired second shōgun, Hidetada. During this period, his income was increased to 53,000 koku, then to 155,000 in 1619. However, in 1622 he fought with Kamehime (Ieyasu's first daughter), fell into disfavor with Hidetada, and was exiled to Yokote, in the Kubota Domain. Masazumi died in Yokote in 1637, at age 73.

Notes

References
 "Honda Masazumi no retsuden" (22 February 2008)
 Mizuno, Norihito. (2003). China in Tokugawa Foreign Relations: The Tokugawa Bakufu’s Perception of and Attitudes toward Ming-Qing China, p. 109. excerpt from Japan and Its East Asian Neighbors: Japan's Perception of China and Korea and the Making of Foreign Policy from the Seventeenth to the Nineteenth Century, Ph.D. dissertation, Ohio State University, 2004, as cited in Tsutsui, William M. (2009).  A Companion to Japanese History, p. 83.

External links
 Images of correspondence by Honda Masazumi

|-

Samurai
1566 births
1637 deaths
Honda clan
Rōjū
Fudai daimyo